The Men's 2018 European Union Amateur Boxing Championships was held in Valladolid, Spain from 8 to 19 November. The 9th edition of the competition was organised by the European governing body for amateur boxing, the European Boxing Confederation.

Medal winners

Medal table

References

External links
 Results

2018 European Union Amateur Boxing Championships
European Union Amateur Boxing Championships
2018 European Union Amateur Boxing Championships
November 2018 sports events in Spain
European Union Amateur Boxing Championships